Aarón Dian Darias Scheithe (born 26 August 1982), known simply as Aarón, is a Spanish footballer. On the right side of the pitch, he can operate as a defender or a midfielder.

Football career
The son of a Spanish father, Aarón was born in Hamburg, West Germany, moving to the land of his ancestor at a very young age and settling in Santa Cruz de Tenerife. He made his senior debut with amateurs UD Tenerife Sur Ibarra, on loan.

Aarón appeared in 18 Segunda División matches in the 2003–04 season, eight as a starter. After a spell in Segunda División B with neighbouring Universidad de Las Palmas CF he returned to his previous club, but failed to reproduce his previous form, leaving in June 2006.

Subsequently, Aarón resumed his career in the third level. On 6 August 2010, he signed with Lorca Atlético CF.

References

External links

1982 births
Living people
German people of Spanish descent
Footballers from Hamburg
Spanish footballers
Footballers from Santa Cruz de Tenerife
Association football defenders
Association football midfielders
Segunda División players
Segunda División B players
Tercera División players
CD Tenerife players
Universidad de Las Palmas CF footballers
Zamora CF footballers
Lorca Deportiva CF footballers
CD Marino players
Caravaca CF players
Lorca Atlético CF players